Pseudopomala brachyptera, known generally as short-winged toothpick grasshopper, is a species of slant-faced grasshopper in the family Acrididae. Other common names include the bunch grass locust and bunchgrass grasshopper. It is found in North America.

References

Further reading

External links

 

Gomphocerinae
Insects described in 1863
Orthoptera of North America